The Anish (Enĕş) is a river in Tsivilsky and Kozlovsky Districts  of the  Republic of Chuvashia, Russia, a right-bank tributary of the Volga. It falls into the Kuybyshev Reservoir, Volga, near Kozlovka.

References

Rivers of Chuvashia